Artur Szpilka (born 12 April 1989) is a Polish professional boxer and mixed martial artist. He has challenged once for the WBC heavyweight title in 2016. He holds a notable win over former two-weight world champion Tomasz Adamek.

Professional career
On 30 June 2012, Szpilka fought Jameel McCline in Lodz, Poland, which he won by unanimous decision (UD). Szpilka's winning secured the fight with Mike Mollo in 2013, the winning by knock out resulted in consequent revenge. Both bouts Szpilka won by an early knock out, despite that in bout he was knocked down and counted. The first fight was over in the sixth round, the second in the fifth, Mollo became grounded unable to rise.

On 25 January 2014 Szpilka was defeated by Bryant Jennings. Jennings initially was to face Mariusz Wach, however Wach pulled out of the fight and Szpilka stepped in as he called out Jennings on Twitter and the fight was arranged shortly afterwards. The fight took place on 25 January 2014 in Madison Square Garden in New York City, New York. Szpilka lost the fight by referee stoppage in the final round. Later that year, on 8 November 2014, Szpilka scored his most significant win following a ten-round UD over former light-heavyweight and cruiserweight world champion Tomasz Adamek.

On 16 January 2016 he fought for the WBC heavyweight title against defending champion Deontay Wilder. Szpilka proved an awkward opponent for Wilder with his elusive style, making the champion miss on many occasions. Unfortunately for Szpilka, while advancing closer to Wilder in round nine, he was caught by a hard right hook on the chin which knocked him out cold. He remained on the canvas for several minutes and needed to be stretchered out of the ring.

About a year and a half after the Wilder fight, Szpilka made his comeback in New York against compatriot Adam Kownacki. Kownacki was in control for most of the fight, dropping Szpilka and subsequently getting a TKO victory in the fourth round. His next fight was another all-Polish main event, this time against former heavyweight world title challenger Mariusz Wach. Szpilka was visibly smaller and was hit flush several times, and at times the fight seemed like it was going to be stopped. However, in the end he succeeded in edging out Wach by a tiny margin and won by split decision.

On 20 July 2019, Szpilka fought former world title challenger Derek Chisora. In what was expected to be an action-packed and entertaining fight, Chisora managed to make easy work out of the Pole and knocked him out in the second round. In 2020 Szpilka moved down to cruiserweight and won his first fight against Serhiy Radchenko by way of majority decision.

Professional boxing record

Mixed martial arts record

|-
| Win
|align=center|2–0
|Denis Zalecki
|TKO (knee injury)
|High League 4: Natsu vs. Lexy 2
|
|align=center|1
|align=center|0:41
|Gliwice, Poland
|
|-
| Win
|align=center|1–0
|Serhiy Radchenko
|TKO (submission to elbow)
|KSW 71: Ziółkowski vs. Rajewski
|
|align=center|2
|align=center|2:52
|Toruń, Poland
|
|-

Pay-per-view bouts

Filmography

References

External links

Artur Szpilka article at sport.pl 
Artur Szpilka – Profile, News Archive & Current Rankings at Box.Live

1989 births
Living people
People from Wieliczka
Sportspeople from Lesser Poland Voivodeship
Polish male boxers
Heavyweight boxers
Polish male mixed martial artists
Mixed martial artists utilizing boxing
Bridgerweight boxers